The 1976 LSU Tigers football team represented Louisiana State University (LSU) during the 1976 NCAA Division I football season.  Under head coach Charles McClendon, the Tigers had a record of 7–3–1 with a Southeastern Conference record of 3–3. It was McClendon's fifteenth season as head coach at LSU.

Schedule

Roster

References

LSU
LSU Tigers football seasons
LSU Tigers football